Visavadar Junction railway station is a small railway station in Junagadh district, Gujarat. Its code is VSW. It serves Visavadar town. The station consists of two platforms. The platforms are not well sheltered. It lacks many facilities including water and sanitation.

Major trains

 52951/52952 Delvada–Junagadh MG Passenger (unreserved)
 52929/52930 Amreli–Veraval MG Passenger (unreserved)
 52933/52946 Amreli–Veraval MG Passenger (unreserved)
 52955/52956 Amreli–Junagadh MG Passenger (unreserved)

References

Railway stations in Junagadh district
Bhavnagar railway division
Railway junction stations in Gujarat